Lacamas Lake is a small lake in Clark County, Washington. It is a popular place to fish and water ski for locals from Vancouver, Camas and Washougal. It connects to Round Lake via a channel that runs under the SR 500 bridge on the southeast side of the lake. In the 1990s many high tech manufacturing plants and expensive housing developments began to appear in the area around the lake. The lake is very warm compared to other lakes in the area and the temperature can drop off quickly with depth. The Georgia-Pacific Mill in Camas used to draw water from the lake to support its operations; however, Georgia-Pacific donated the two dams on Round Lake to the City of Camas in 2018.

History
The Lacamas Lake Dam was constructed at the south end of Round Lake in 1883.

Water quality
The  around Lacamas Lake and Round Lake collect precipitation and form the Lacamas Creek which feeds into both lakes. This area is mostly large open fields and private farm or ranch land. The resulting runoff contains high levels of fertilizers which leads to nutrient abundance in both lakes. This nutrient abundance and lack of circulation in the lower depths has caused severe algae problems. Consequently, only a few fish species are able to live in either lake (brown trout, rainbow trout, largemouth bass, bluegill, crappie, yellow perch, catfish and sturgeon). The government classifies the lake as eutrophic.

There have been considerations of using a special aerator for lakes called a "Speece Cone", some parts of the world that have eutrophic lakes use biological means such as Dyes, Enzymes, 
and Barley Hay to remedy algae issues in eutrophic lakes.

"Dead Zone" 
One of the reasons the lake cannot support many fish is because of severe pollution from phosphorus, nitrogen, ammonia, as well as lack of circulation to the deeper parts of the lake.  This allows a detritus sludge to form that is devoid of oxygen, not allowing the organic compounds to break down efficiently. The phosphorus, nitrogen and ammonia collect in the lake water and the lake bed from polluted streams that run into the lake after passing through farm fields, barnyards and subdivisions.

As it is now, the -long lake is murky. The sun warms the top layer of lake water and makes it suitable for warm-water fish such as bass, bluegill and perch. It has very green murky water.

In Fall the Aquatic plants such as the invasive Elodea and Algae die, they  sink to the bottom, where they decay, using up still more oxygen, making the colder depths barren and lifeless. The Washington Department of Fish and Wildlife makes the lake more fishable by planting brown or rainbow trout, but few survive year to year.

Activities

Running, hiking and biking 
Lacamas Lake has a well-maintained  trail (the Lacamas Heritage Trail) along its entire southern edge.  The trail is hard-packed dirt and gravel and is generally suitable for strollers.  The trail is popular with hikers, runners, and bicyclists, and is wide enough for single-file two-way foot and bike traffic.  The trail is generally flat with frequent but relatively shallow inclines.  The trail has quarter-mile posts along its entire length with distances to both ends shown.

The west end of the trail has a small parking lot with restrooms, dog scoop bags, and a water fountain.  The parking lot may be found at the intersection of NE Goodwin Rd. and NW Alexandria Dr. in Camas.  This lot often fills up on nice days and weekends, and there is no good overflow area for cars; the east end of the trail has more parking.

The east end of the trail begins near the southeast boat ramp.  This area features a large parking lot, restrooms, water fountain, a park, boat ramp, and children's play structure.  The parking lot may be found on Lake Rd. just west of SR500.  An overflow parking lot is also available 100 yards to the west near the trailer park.  Dog scoop bags are available on the trail.  Dog leash requirements are posted.

Swimming 
Swimming is popular in the summer due to the warm water temperatures.  The City of Camas posts public notices regarding outbreaks of blue green algae.

Boating 
Lacamas Lake has two public boat ramps: one on the north side and one on the southeast side.  The southeast boat ramp is located within Camas Heritage Park and is nicer with more amenities.

Because of its small size, personal watercraft such as Jetskis and Waverunners are somewhat less popular here than at some of the other local lakes and rivers.

References

External links
Information on government monitoring of the lake

Camas, Washington
Lacamas
Lakes of Clark County, Washington
Tourist attractions in Clark County, Washington